Leal is a ghost town in Atascosa and Bexar counties, in the U.S. state of Texas. It is located within the San Antonio metropolitan area.

History
A post office was established at Leal in 1858 and remained in operation until 1867. It was named in honor of a local family. The community disappeared after the Civil War and is now a part of the communities of Cassin and Earle.

Geography
Leal is located at the intersection of Leon Creek and the Medina River in southern Bexar County. It also extends into Atascosa County.

Education
Leal is served by the Pleasanton Independent School District.

References

Ghost towns in Texas